The World Figure Skating Championships is an annual figure skating competition sanctioned by the International Skating Union in which figure skaters compete for the title of World Champion.

Men's competitions took place on February 18 to 19 in Berlin, Germany and ladies' competitions took place on February 4 to 5 in Stockholm, Sweden. Pairs' competition took place on February 18 in Berlin, Germany.

Results

Men

 Referee: Dr.Kurt Dannenberg 

Judges:
 O. Gattwinkel 
 Herbert J. Clarke 
 Rudolf Kaler 
 J. Liedemann 
 E. Delpy 
 P. Sörensen 
 Walter Jakobsson

Ladies

Judges:
 Herbert J. Clarke 
 H. Deistler 
 Z. Johansen 
 Thore Mothander 
 P. Weiss

Pairs

Judges:
 P. Weiss 
 Herbert J. Clarke 
 Eduard Engelmann Jr. 
 E. Bonfiglio 
 A. Winkler 
 Otto Zappe 
 Alfred Theuer 
 Ludowika Jakobsson

Sources
 Result list provided by the ISU

World Figure Skating Championships
World Figure Skating Championships, 1938
World 1938
World 1938
World Figure Skating Championships, 1938
World Figure Skating Championships, 1938
1930s in Berlin
1930s in Stockholm
February 1938 sports events
Sports competitions in Berlin